This is a list of Ultimate Marvel characters.

A
Ant-Man
Abomination (Lam, Chang)
Abraham Cornelius
Abraham Erskine
Absorbing Man (Creel, Carl)
Adrian Toomes
Agatha Harkness
AIM agents (MODOK's servants)
Alpha Dog
Amphibian (Squadron Supreme)
Anaconda (Sitznski, Blanche)
Ancient One
Apocalypse
Arcade (unknown)
Arcanna (Squadron Supreme)
Arnim Zola
Angel (Worthington III, Warren)
Arsenal
Asp (Nefertiti, Cleo)
Ares

B
Balder
Banshee (comics) (Sean Cassidy)
Baron Zemo
Baron Strucker
Beetle (unknown)
Ben Parker
Ben Reilly
Betty Brant
Betty Ross
Bishop
Black Bolt
Black Cat (Hardy, Felicia)
Black Jack Tarr
Black Knight (Whitman, Dane)
Black Mamba (Sealy, Tanya)
Black Panther (Udaku, T'Challa)
Black Talon
Black Widow (Chang, Monica)
Black Widow (Romanoff, Natasha)
Blackheart
Blacklash (Scott, Marc)
Blade (unknown)
Blob (real name Fred J. Dukes)
Blur (Squadron Supreme)
Bolivar Trask
Bombshell
Boomerang (Myers, Fred)
Bucky
Bulldozer
Bullseye (Poindexter, Benjamin) 
Bruce Banner
Blastaar
Bobbi Morse

C
Cable (Future Version of Wolverine)
Callisto
Camellia
Cannonball (Guthrie, Sam)
Captain America (Rogers, Steve)
Captain Atlas
Captain Britain (Braddock, Brian)
Captain France (Etherlinck, Hugo)
Captain Italy (Landi, Umberto)
Captain Spain (Fraile, Carlos)
Captain UK
Carnage
Carol Danvers
Cathrine Mora
Chameleon
The Champion
Chitauri
Ultimate Marvel
The Colonel (Al-Rahman, Abd)
Colossus
Contessa Valentina Allegra di Fontaine
Crossbones (Rumlow, Brock)
Crystal
Cyclops (Scott Summers)
Clint Barton

D
Dai Thomas
Daniel Toliver
Daredevil (Murdock, Matthew "Matt")
Dario Agger (formwalking CEO)
Dazzler (Blaire, Allison "Ali")
Deacon Frost
Deadpool (Wilson, Wade)
Death Adder (unknown)
Deathlok (Peterson, Michael "Mike")
Deathstrike (Oyama, Yuriko)
Derek Morgan
 Deke Shaw
Detonator (Gibson, Ricky)
Devil Dinosaur
Diablo (Esteban Corazon de Ablo)
Doctor Octopus (Octavius, Otto)
Doctor Strange (Strange, Stephen Sr.)
Dormamu
Domino
Drake Raven
Doctor Doom 
list of the weakest marvel characters 
Doombot
Doctor Spectrum (Squadron Supreme)
Dr. Faustus
Dreadknight (Bram Velsing)
Dreamcatcher
De Lone Wolf (Asim Limbu)
Daisy Johnson

E and F
 Ebony Maw
Echo (Maya Lopez)
Ego
Electro (Dillon, Max)
Elektra (Natchios, Elektra)
Emma Frost
Enchantress
Enid Rich
Ellie Camacho (Deadpool)
Falcon (Wilson, Sam)
Fancy Dan (Rubenstein, Dan)
Fandral
Fenris (von Strucker, Andrea and Andreas)
Filament
Fin Casey (Ivory Shadow)
Firepower
Firestar (Allen, Elizabeth "Liz")
Forge (unknown)
Fountain
Franklin "Foggy" Nelson
Franklin Richards
Franklin Storm
Fred "Flash" Thompson
Fury

G
Gah Lak Tus
Gallowglass
Gambit (LeBeau, Remy)
Gamora
Garrison Kane
Geldoff
Ghost
Ghost Rider
Ghostware
Giant Man / Ant Man / Yellowjacket (Pym, Henry "Hank")
Giant Man (Scott Lang)
Gladiator
Glenn Talbot
Green Goblin (Osborn, Norman)
Gorgon
Grass Hopper
Grizzly
Gregory Stark
Guardian
Gwen Stacy
Gwen Stacy (clone)/Carnage
Groot
Gilgamesh

H
Hammer (Canty, Eisenhower)
Hammerhead (unknown)
Hard-Drive (unknown)
Havok (Summers, Alexander "Alex")
Hawk-Owl (Danner, Jack)
Hawkeye (Barton, Clint) member of avengers.
Heather Hudson
Heimdall
Hela
He who remains
Hobgoblin (Harry Osborn)
Hogun
Howard the Duck
Hulk (Banner, Robert Bruce)
Human Torch (Storm, John "Johnny")
Human Torch (Jim Hammond "firebug")
Human Torch (Marvel Zombies)
Hurricane (unknown)
Hyperion (Squadron Supreme)
Howard Stark

I
Iceman (Drake, Robert "Bobby")
Ikaris
Impossible Man
Inertia (Squadron Supreme)
Invisible Woman (Susan Storm)
Iron Fist (Rand, Daniel "Danny")
Iron Man (Stark, Antonio "Tony")
Iron Monger (Obadiah Stane)

J
Jackal
James Braddock
James Hudson
James Rupert "Jim" Rhodes (War Machine)
James Buchanan "Bucky" Barnes
Jane Foster
Janet van Dyne
Jarvis, Edwin
Jeanne de Wolfe
Jennifer Walters
Jessica Jones
Jimmy Hudson
Jimmy Woo
John Ryker
John Stacy
J. Jonah Jameson
Juggernaut (Marko, Cain)
Justin Hammer

K
Kaine 
Kang the Conqueror
Karen Grant (Jean Grey)
Karma (Mahn, Xi'an Coy)
Karnak
Ka-Zar
Kenny "King Kong" McFarlane
Kingpin (Fisk, Wilson)
Kraven The Hunter (Kravinoff, Sergei)
Kree
Korg
Kate Bishop
Karen Page

L
Lady Lark
Layla miller
Lee (first name unknown)
Leech
Leviathan
 Leo Fitz
Lieberman (first name unknown)
Lilandra Neramani
Lizard (Connors, Curtus)
Lockjaw
Loki 
Longshot (Centino, Arthur)
Luke Cage
Liberatos
Layla El Faouly

M
Madame Web (Cassandra Web)
 Madam Masque
Magician (Boggs, Elliot)
Magneto (Lensherr, Erik)(Max Eisenhardt)
Marvel Girl (Grey, Jean)
Man-Ape (M'Baku)
Mandarin
Man-Thing (Sallis, Ted)
 Mantis
Mark Raxton
Mary Parker
Mary Jane Watson
Master Menace (Emil Burbank) (Squadron Supreme)
Mastermind (unknown)
Maximus
May Parker
Mephisto
 Melinda May
Miles Warren
Miles Bullock "Captain Winter"
Miles Morales
Mister Fantastic/Maker (Richards, Reed)
Mister Fantastic (Richards, Reed) (Marvel zombies)
Mister Nix
Mr. Rose
Ms. Marvel
MODOK (Tarleton, George)
Mojo Adams
Mole Man (Molekevic, Arthur, Harvey elder)
Morbius (Michael Morbius)
Moira MacTaggert
Morlocks
Montana (Bale, Montana)
Moondragon (Douglas, Heather)
Medusa
Moon Knight (Spector, Marc) (Lockley, Jake) (Grant, Steven)
Multiple Man (Madrox, James)
Mysterio (Beck, Quentin) 
Mystique (Darkhölme, Raven)
M-11
M-Twins (Nicole and Claudette)
Ma Gnucci
Gideon Mace
Jason Macendale
Mach-VI (Beetle)
Machete (Lopez, Ferdinand)
Machine Man (Aaron Stack)
Machine Teen (Adam Aaronson)
Machinesmith (Samuel Saxon)
Al MacKenzie
Mad Dog (Robert Baxter)
Mad Thinker (Julius)
Madame Hydra (Viper)
Madame Menace (Sunset Bain)
Madame Sanctity (Tanya Trask)
Madcap
Madman (Philip Sterns)
Maelstrom
Maestro (Dr. Robert Bruce Banner)
Maggot (Japheth)
Magik (Illyana Rasputina)
Magique
Magma (Amara Aquila)
Magnir
Magnus (Magneto)
Maha Yogi
mahkizmo
mahr Vehl (Geheneris Hala’son)
Mainframe
Major Liberty (John Liberty)
major Mapleleaf (Louis Sadler Jr.)
Makkari
Malekith
Malice
Marlene Alraune
Mammomax (Maximus Jensen)
Man-Beast
Man-Bull (William Taurens)
Man-Elephant (Manfred Haller)
Man-Killer (Katrina Van Horn)
Man-Spider (Peter Parker)
Man Mountain Marko (Michael)
Manbot (Bernie Lachenay)
Mandrill (Jerome Beechman)
Mangler (Shadrick Daniels)
Mangog 
Manifold (Eden Fesi)
Manikin (Whitman Knapp)
Manphibian
Mansalughter
Manta
Marrow (Sarah)
Martyr
Marvel Boy (Noh-Varr)
Marvel Girl 
Marvelman (Michael Moran)
Massacre (Marcus Lyman)
Masked Marauder (Frank Farnum)
Masked Raider (Jim Gardley)
Mass Master (Jack Power)
Master Hate (Sire Hate)
Master Izo
Master Khan
Mastermind Excello (Amadeus Cho)
Master Mold (Stephen Lang)
Master of the World (Eshu)
Master Order
Master Pandemonium (Martin Preston)
Matador (Manuel Eloganto)
Match (Anthony Masters)
Mauler (Aaron Soames)
Maverick (David North)
Max
Maxam
Melinda May
Mayhem
Megan McLaren
Meanstreak (Henri Huang)
Megatak (Gregory Nettles)
Meggan
Melter (Bruno Horgan)
Menace (Lily Hollistr)
Mentallo (Marvin Flumm)
Mentor (A’Lars)
Mercury (Cessily Kincaid)
Mercy (Abigail Wright)
Merlin
Merlyn
Mesmero (Vincent)
Metal Master (Molyb)
Metalhead (Edward Osako)
Meteorite (Karla Sofen)
Mettle (Ken Mack)
Microbe (Zachary smith)
Microchip
Micromax (Scott Wright)
Midas (Malcolm Meriwell)
Midgard Serpent (Jormungand)
Midnight (Anton Mogart)
Midnight sun (M’Nai)
Midnight Fire (Aaron Chord)
Miek
Milan (Francisco)
Mimic (Calvin Rankin)
Mimir
Mind-Wave (Erik Gelden)
Mindblast (Danielle forte)
Mindless Ones
Mindworm (William Turner)
Minotaur (Dario Agger)
Miracle Man (Joshua Ayers)
Mirage (Desmond Charne)
Mister Fish (Mortimer Norris)
Mister Hyde (Calvin Zabo)
Mister Gideon (Gideon Wilson)
Mr. Immortal 
Mister Jip
Mister M (Absolon Mercator)
Mister Negative (Martin Li)
Mister Rasputin (Pavel Plotnick)
Mister Sensitive (Guy Smith)
Mistress Love
Michelle Jones-Watson
Mockingbird (Barbara Morse)
MODAM
Max Modell
Modred the Mystic
Modular Man (Stephen Weems)
Molecule Man
Mondo
Mongoose
Monkey Joe

N
Namor
Nathaniel Richards
Nerd Hulk (Clone of Original Hulk)
Nebula
The New Sentinels
Nightmare
Nightcrawler (Wagner, Kurt)
Nighthawk (Richmond, Kyle)
Nick Fury
Nihil
Northstar (Beaubier, Jean-Paul)
Nova (Rick Jones)
Nuke (Squadron Supreme)
Nuke

O
Odin
Omega Red (unknown)
The One Above All
Onslaught
Orb Weaver (unknown)
Owl
Ox (Sanchez, Bruno)
Okoye
Ophelia (AIDA in the Framework)

P
Paladin (Marc Spector)
Pandora (Margaret Watson)
Penultimate
Ultimate Marvel
Perun (unknown)
Pete Wisdom
Phil Coulson
Phoenix Force
Phoebe McAllister
Piledriver
Polaris (Dane, Lorna)
Power Man (Cage, Luke)
Power Princess (Squadron Supreme)
Primal Screamer
Princess Python
The Principal (Jones, Larry)
Prowler (Aaron Davis)
Proteus (Xavier, David)
Ultimate Marvel
Psylocke (Braddock, Elisabeth "Betsy")
Pyro (unknown)
Pepper Potts
The Punisher
Peter Parker
Peter Quill
Pietro Maximoff
Puck

Q
 Quake (Johnson, Daisy)
Quasar
Quicksilver (Lensherr, Pietro)

R
Rage
Ralph Bohner (Wandavision)
Red Skull
Red Ghost
Red Guardian
Red Wasp (Petra Laskov)
RHINO
Rhona Burchill
Robbie Burchill
Richard Parker
Ringer (Davis, Anthony)
Robbie Robertson
Rocket Raccoon
Rocket Raccoon
Rogue (Anna Marie (surname unknown))
Ronan the Accuser
Ronin

S
Sabra
Sabretooth (Creed, Victor) 
Samual Sterns
Sandman (Marko, Flint)
Sasquatch
Sam Bullit
Scarlet Witch (Lensherr, Wanda)
Schizoid Man (unknown)
Scorpion (clone of Peter Parker)
Sentinels
Sersi
Shadowcat (Pryde, Kitty)
Shang-Chi
Shaman
S.H.I.E.L.D.
Shinobi Shaw
Shape (Squadron Supreme)
Sharon Carter
Ultimate Marvel
Sky-Eater
Skrull
Sebastian Shaw
Spector, Marc
Spider-Girl (Parker, May)
Spider-Man (Parker, Peter Benjamin)
Spider-Woman (Drew, Jessica)
Shocker
Storm
Star-Lord (Peter Jason Quill)
 S.W.O.R.D.
Sylvie
Steven strange(doctor strange)

T
Tandy Bowen
Tarantula
Thaddeus Aloysius Cadwallader "Dum-Dum" Dugan
Thaddeus E. "Thunderbolt" Ross
Thanos 
Thing (Grimm, Benjamin J. "Ben")
Thing (Marvel Zombies)
Thor
Thunderball
Tinkerer (Stern, Elijah)
Titanium Man
Toad (unknown)
Tom Thumb (Squadron Supreme)
Trey Langstrom
Triton
Thor
Tyrone Cash
Thunderbolt
Tony Stark (Iron Man)

U
Ultron
Unus (unknown)
Urich, Ben
Unicorn
Uatu (The Watcher)
Ulik (Rock Troll)
Ultimatum (Comic Miles Morales)
Ultimo (Giant Robot)
Ultimus (Ard-Con)
Ultragirl (Suzy Sherman)
Ulysses Klaue
U-Man (Meranno)
Umar
Underworld
Uni-Mind
Union Jack (Joseph Chapman)
Unuscione
Uranos
Phil Urich
Ursa Major (Mikhail Uriokovitch Ursus)
U.S. Agent

V
Valkyrie (Barbara (surname unknown))
Val Cooper
Vanisher (unknown)
Venom (Brock, Eddie Jr.)
Vindicator (Wraith, John)
Vision
Vulture (Drago, Blackie)
Vengeance
Volstagg
Valkume
Vagabond
Valkin
Vanguard
Vapor
Vargas
Varnae
Vector
Veil

W
Wasp (Pym, Janet) 
Whiz Kid (Taki, Matsuya)
Wildpack (Chen, Powell, Quartermain)
Winter Soldier (James "Bucky" Buchanan Barnes)
Wolverine (Howlett, James "Logan") 
Woo, Jimmy
Woody (Kipple, Hank)
War Machine#Ultimate Marvel (James Rhodes)
Wong
Whizzer
Wrecker
Wolfsbane (Rahne Sinclair)
Warlock
Wanda Maximoff (Scarlet Witch)
Walking Stiletto 
Wallflower (Laurie Collins)
Walrus (Hubert Carpenter)
War (Abraham Kieros)
War Dog 
Warbird (Carol Danvers)
Adam Warlock
Warpath (James Proudstar)
Warrior Woman (Julia Frieda Koenig Lohmer)
Warstar (B'nee)

X
X-23 (Laura, Kinney)
Xorn (Kuan-Yi)
X-man (from future)
Xavin
Xavier
X-Cutioner (Denti)
Xemnu (Amos Moses)
Xi'an Coy Manh (Karma)
Xorn
X-ray (James Darnell)

Y
Ymir (Ice Giant)
Yellowjacket (Henry Pym)
Yondu
Yelena Belova
Y'Garon
Yandroth
Mariko Yashida
Shingen Yashida
Yellow Claw (Plan Tzu)
Yeti
Ho Yinsen
Yon-Rogg (Magnitron)
Yukio
Yukon Jack (Yukotujakzurjimozoata)

Z
Zabu
Zero
Zorn (Shen-Yi)
Zemo
Zadkiel
Zeus
Zaladane
Zarathos
Zarrko
ZeitGeist
Zephyr
Zero-G
Zheng Zu